Rwanda Investigation Bureau (RIB;) is a Rwandan national law enforcement agency. Its head office is in Kamukina, Kigali.

See also
 Paul Rusesabagina

References

External links
 Rwanda Investigation Bureau
Law enforcement in Rwanda
Government of Rwanda